Lucas Pérez Martínez (born 10 September 1988) is a Spanish professional footballer who plays as a forward for Primera Federación club Deportivo de La Coruña.

After spending the first years of his career in the lower leagues, only appearing sporadically for the first team of Rayo Vallecano in the Segunda División, he first made a name for himself with Karpaty Lviv in the Ukrainian Premier League. In 2013, he signed with PAOK from Greece, and later returned to La Liga with Deportivo, where he scored 32 goals in 93 matches. 

Subsequently, he represented English clubs Arsenal and West Ham United in the Premier League, before rejoining Alavés where he had played as a youth.

Club career

Atlético and Rayo
Pérez was born in A Coruña, Galicia. After appearing for three clubs as a youth he moved to Madrid and joined Atlético Madrid's C team, playing two seasons in Tercera División. In summer 2009 he signed with Rayo Vallecano, helping the reserves promote from the same level in his first year.

In the 2010–11 season, Pérez contributed five games and one goal (in a 3–0 home win against Real Valladolid on 6 November 2010) as Rayo returned to La Liga after eight years. He continued to be mainly registered with the B side, however.

Karpaty Lviv

On 17 January 2011, free agent Pérez joined FC Karpaty Lviv on a three-year deal. He scored his first goal for the team on 17 July, against FC Chornomorets Odesa in a 1–1 Ukrainian Premier League draw.

Pérez netted a hat-trick on 4 November 2012 in a 4–0 home victory over FC Kryvbas Kryvyi Rih, including a long-distance volley from a corner kick delivery. In January 2013 he joined fellow league club FC Dynamo Kyiv on loan for the remainder of the campaign, and later labelled his experience as "a nightmare".

PAOK and Deportivo La Coruña
On 5 July 2013, Pérez signed on a fee of €700,000 a three-year contract with Super League Greece team PAOK FC. He scored his first competitive goal on 17 August, contributing to a 3–0 home defeat of Skoda Xanthi FC, and on 24 November he equalised in a 3–1 win over Aris Thessaloniki F.C. in the Derby of Northern Greece. He also helped to a runner-up run in the national cup, losing the decisive match to Panathinaikos FC.

On 18 July 2014, Pérez returned to Spain and joined his newly promoted hometown side Deportivo de La Coruña in a one-year loan deal, with a buyout clause. He scored in his first official appearance, having started in a 3–0 home victory against Valencia CF on 19 October which also marked his La Liga debut. The following matchday, he was replaced in the 15th minute of a 0–0 away draw at RCD Espanyol due to a knee injury.

Pérez only returned to action in January of the following year, appearing 12 minutes in a 0–4 home loss against FC Barcelona. On 23 May, against the same opponent at the Camp Nou, he helped Dépor come from behind by scoring in the 67th minute of a 2–2 draw in the last round that prevented relegation.

On 23 July 2015, in his first competitive match upon his return to PAOK, against NK Lokomotiva in the second preliminary round of the UEFA Europa League, Pérez scored the opener after Róbert Mak's shot was saved, in an eventual 6–0 home rout. One week later, against FC Spartak Trnava for the same competition, he netted the game's only goal in the first leg.

On 12 August 2015, Pérez signed a permanent four-year deal with Deportivo. On 12 December, he took his season tally to 11 goals in only 15 games, helping to a 2–2 draw with Barcelona.

Pérez totalled a career-best 17 goals at the end of the campaign, eventually helping his team escape relegation again.

Arsenal
On 27 August 2016, Arsène Wenger said that Pérez had completed a medical examination in order to join Arsenal after the paperwork was done. Three days later, the transfer was confirmed by the club for a reported fee of £17.1 million. He made his competitive debut in the 2–1 Premier League home win over Southampton on 10 September, which coincided with both his birthday and that of teammate Laurent Koscielny, whom he assisted for his team's equaliser.

On 20 September 2016, during an EFL Cup away match against Nottingham Forest, Pérez scored his first goals for the Gunners, grabbing a brace in an eventual 4–0 victory in the third round. On 6 December, he contributed three goals in 39 minutes to a 4–1 away defeat of FC Basel in the UEFA Champions League's group stage, helping Arsenal win the group.

On 3 January 2017, Pérez netted for the first time in the domestic league, helping his team come back from 3–0 down to draw 3–3 at AFC Bournemouth. Towards the end of the month, he provided an assist to Danny Welbeck's first-ever brace for Arsenal, in a 5–0 away win against Southampton in the FA Cup.

On 31 August 2017, Pérez rejoined Deportivo on a season-long loan deal.

West Ham United
On 9 August 2018, Pérez signed a three-year contract with West Ham United for a reported fee of £4 million. He made his league debut for his new club nine days later, coming on as a 77th-minute substitute for Mark Noble in a 1–2 home loss to Bournemouth. He scored his first goal for them on 26 September, in their 8–0 demolition of Macclesfield Town in the EFL Cup.

On 4 December 2018, Pérez scored his first league goals for 700 days: coming on for Marko Arnautović, he scored twice in a 3–1 home victory against Cardiff City, becoming the first West Ham player to achieve the feat as a substitute since Paulo Wanchope in 2000.

Alavés
In May 2019, West Ham accepted an offer from Deportivo Alavés for Peréz for a fee of €2.5m subject to a medical. He officially signed for the club on 3 June, making his league debut on 18 August by playing the last minutes of the 1–0 home victory over Levante UD. He scored his first goal on 29 September, the first in a 2–0 win against RCD Mallorca also at Mendizorrotza Stadium.

On 29 October 2019, Pérez equalised in a 1–1 home draw with Atlético Madrid, becoming the first Alavés player to score in five consecutive La Liga games since 1955. He repeated the feat the following match (at CA Osasuna, 4–2 loss), and in the process became their first player to achieve that in six consecutive fixtures. He found the net for the seventh time on 9 November against Real Valladolid, becoming the first player in the history of the competition to score in seven consecutive matches with two different teams, as he had done it before with Deportivo.

Pérez terminated his contract on 18 August 2021.

Elche and Cádiz
On 31 August 2021, free agent Pérez signed a one-year deal with Elche CF, still in the top tier. The following 31 January, he moved to Cádiz CF of the same league on a 18-month contract.

Fourth spell at Deportivo
Pérez agreed to a return to Deportivo on 31 December 2022, with the deal being made effective at the opening of the January transfer window; the player himself paid €493,000 in order to be released. He scored a brace on his Primera Federación debut eight days later, in a 3–0 win over Unionistas de Salamanca CF.

International career
Pérez earned his first cap for the Galicia autonomous team on 20 May 2016, appearing in the 2–2 friendly with Venezuela.

Career statistics

Honours
PAOK
Greek Football Cup runner-up: 2013–14

Arsenal
FA Cup: 2016–17

References

External links

1988 births
Living people
Spanish footballers
Footballers from A Coruña
Association football wingers
Association football forwards
La Liga players
Segunda División players
Segunda División B players
Tercera División players
Primera Federación players
Atlético Madrid C players
Rayo Vallecano B players
Rayo Vallecano players
Deportivo de La Coruña players
Deportivo Alavés players
Elche CF players
Cádiz CF players
Ukrainian Premier League players
FC Karpaty Lviv players
FC Dynamo Kyiv players
Super League Greece players
PAOK FC players
Premier League players
Arsenal F.C. players
West Ham United F.C. players
Spanish expatriate footballers
Expatriate footballers in Ukraine
Expatriate footballers in Greece
Expatriate footballers in England
Spanish expatriate sportspeople in Ukraine
Spanish expatriate sportspeople in Greece
Spanish expatriate sportspeople in England